Frank Pedrick (April 15, 1896 – May 8, 1981) was an American politician.

Frank Pedrick was born in Wapello County, Iowa to parents Samuel Manro and Emma Peck Pedrick on April 15, 1896. He served in World War I, with the United States Navy. Pedrick married Isal F. Judd in 1930. Pedrick operated the Pedrick and Thorne Hardware store in Ottumwa from 1935 to 1961. He was a Freemason and member of the Kiwanis. From 1951 to 1955, Pedrick was a Republican member of the Iowa House of Representatives from District 18. He died on May 8, 1981, in Ottumwa.

References

20th-century American businesspeople
Republican Party members of the Iowa House of Representatives
People from Ottumwa, Iowa
1896 births
1981 deaths
20th-century American politicians
Businesspeople from Iowa
United States Navy personnel of World War I
Military personnel from Iowa
American Freemasons